Noises, Sounds & Sweet Airs is a 1991 opera by Michael Nyman that began as an opera-ballet titled La Princesse de Milan choreographed by Karine Saporta.  The libretto is William Shakespeare's The Tempest, as abridged by the composer.  The title is derived from Caliban's line, "This isle is full of noises, sounds, and sweet airs, which give delight and hurt not." It premiered in June 1991 in Hérouville-Saint-Clair, Calvados, France, with the L'Ensemble de Basse-Normandie conducted by Dominique Debart.  Three members of Saporta's dance company provided the singing.

The opera is scored for one soprano, one contralto, and one tenor, two saxophones, and orchestra.  The three singers are not assigned roles on character lines.  They are voices, "carriers of text", and two or three singers often sing the role of a single character at points in the opera, and no character is sung consistently by any one voice.  As originally performed, the dancers portrayed the characters.  Nyman's liner notes of the recording give no indication of how the opera could be staged dramatically without the dancers, even though which title is used is dependent upon whether dancers are utilized.  The opera-only version, which premiered in 1993, also includes more of Shakespeare's text.

Nyman and Saporta collaborated on Prospero's Books, Peter Greenaway's film version of The Tempest, and were interested in working further with the play.  Nyman did not base his score on that he wrote for Prospero's Books, but began a new score from scratch, occasionally interpolating music from the previous score as is his wont.  He chose not to set Ariel's songs or the Masque, which he had already set, but he allows for them to be interpolated into the opera.

Libretto
The libretto, an abridgement of Shakespeare's play (with some slight wording changes) is divided into seventeen sections:

If by your Art, my dearest father (Act I, Scene 2)
Alas, poor Milan! (Act I, Scene 2)
Be't to fly (Act I, Scene 2)
This damned witch Sycorax (Act I, Scene 2)
The fringed curtains of thine eye advance (Act I, Scene 2)
There's nothing ill can dwell in such a temple (Act I, Scene 2)
How lush and lusty the grass looks! (Act II, Scene 1)
Riches, poverty, and use of service, none (Act II, Scene 1)
Sometime like apes/The master, the gunner, the boatswain, and I (Act II, Scene 2)
Full many a lady I have eyed with best regard (Act III, Scene 1)
'Tis a custom in the afternoon to sleep (Act III, Scenes 2 and 3)
I have made you mad (Act III, Scene 3, Act IV, Scene 1)
You do look, my son, in a moved sort (Act IV, Scene 1, Act V, Scene 1)
Ye elves (Act V, Scene 1)
Thy brother was a furtherer in the act. (Act V, Scene 1)
Sir, she is mortal (Act V, Scene 1)
My tricksy spirit! (Act V, Scene 1)

Nyman allows for "The Masque", written for Prospero's Books, to be inserted between Sections 12 and 13.  If the Ariel songs were included (which Nyman says nothing about doing in the liner notes, and the music as recorded does not necessarily pause), "Come Unto These Yellow Sands" and "Full Fathom Five" would come between sections 4 and 5, "While You Here Do Snoring Lie" between sections 8 and 9, "Come and Go" immediately before "The Masque," and "Where the Bee Sucks" just before "Behold, sir King" as divided on the album, based on the order of the text in the play.

Album

The album, Nyman's 25th release, was released by Argo Records on May 16, 1995.  It has a running time of 72:35.  It was again performed by  L'Ensemble de Basse-Normandie conducted by Dominque Debart.  The saxophones are played by David Roach and Andrew Findon.  It is the fourth release of Nyman's music that Nyman himself supervised, on which he provides liner notes and produced, but neither performs nor conducts.  The album is the first of Nyman's many collaborations with Hilary Summers.

Personnel

Cast
Catherine Bott, soprano
Hilary Summers, contralto
Ian Bostridge, tenor
David Roach, saxophone
Andrew Findon, saxophone
Dominique Debart, conductor

Crew
Instrumental recording produced by David Cunningham & Michael Nyman
Vocal recording produced by Andrew Cornall & Michael Nyman
Mixed by Michael J. Dutton & Michael Nyman
Executive producer:  Michael J. Dutton
Engineer:  Michael J. Dutton
Assistant engineers:  Chris Brown & Denis Wauthy
Artist representative for Michael Nyman:  Nigel Barr
Art direction: David Smart
Design: Jeremy Tilston

Recorded in Caen, June 1991, and Abbey Road Studios, London, June 1993.

Mixed at Kitsch Studio, Brussels

Edited at Transfermation and Abbey Road Studios, London

Track listing

The track listing differs slightly from the sections of the opera.  Up through section 12, the tracks conform to the sections.  Section 13, however, is spread over three tracks, "You do look, my son, in a moved sort", "At last I left them", and "At this hour lie at my mercy."  Section 15 does not start at the beginning of a new track, but is appended at the end of track 16/Section 14, "Ye elves", and begins a new track with "Behold, sir King" (possibly done to facilitate the editing in of Ariel's songs from Prospero's Books, if desired).  Finally, section 17, is divided into two tracks, "My tricksy spirit!" and "Coragio, bully-monster", for a total of twenty tracks from the seventeen sections.

If by your Art, my dearest father 4:02
Alas, poor Milan! 3:51
Be't to fly 3:40
This damned witch Sycorax 4:37
The fringed curtains of thine eye 4:35
There's nothing ill can dwell 2:46
How lush and lusty the grass  3:12
Riches, poverty, and use of service 2:21
Sometime like apes 2:49
Full many a lady I have eyed 4:35
'Tis a custom in the afternoon to sleep 5:37
I have made you mad  4:15
You do look, my son, in a moved sort 3:40
At last I left them 1:30
At this hour lie at my mercy 1:48
Ye elves 6:56
Behold, sir King 2:05
Sir, she is mortal 1:42
My tricksy spirit! 3:03
Coragio, bully-monster 5:51

See also
Caliban

Notes

References
Nyman, Michael.  Noises, Sounds & Sweet Airs.  Argo Records, 1995.  Liner notes.

External links
Noises, Sounds & Sweet Airs on Michael Nyman.com
La Princesse de Milan at saporta-danse.com
original recording of the opera on YouTube
original recording with songs from Prospero's Books interpolated on YouTube
Negative review of live opera by Phil Johnson for The Independent
Album review on classical.net
Score (Vocal parts with piano reduction)

Operas by Michael Nyman
English-language operas
Operas
1991 operas
Operas based on The Tempest